Ahmet Gökhan Özen (born 29 November 1979) is a Turkish singer and songwriter.

Personal life 
His family are from Beşikdüzü, Trabzon. On 7 July 2010, he married Selen Sevigen. The couple's first daughter Ada Deren was born in 2012. Another daughter named Derin Su was born in 2015. In November 2016, the couple announced their divorce via a written press release.

In 2005, hairdresser Mehmet Gülsüm was kidnapped and beaten, and Özen was imprisoned for 2 months for inciting the crime.

Discography

Albums
 2000: Özelsin 
 2001: Duman Gözlüm
 2002: Duman Gözlüm remix albüm
 2003: Civciv
 2004: Her Şeyde Biraz Sen Varsın (Valentine's Day's special edition) 2004: Aslında 
 2005: Kalbim Seninle - One More Time 
 2007: Resimler & Hayaller 2008: Bize Aşk Lazım 
 2010: Daha Erken 2010: Başka 2013: Milyoner 2015: Maske 2020: Firardayım 2021: Firardayım (Deluxe)''

Music videos
2000: "Üşüyorum"
2001: "Aramazsan Arama"
2001: "Tabir-i Caizse"
2002: "Dön Çarem"
2002: "Ayaz"	
2003: "Civciv"
2003: "Boşver"	
2004: "Herşeyde Biraz Sen Varsın"
2004: "Öyle Büyü Ki Kalbimde"	
2004: "Sana Yine Muhtacım"
2004: "Kader Utansın"	
2005: "Birtanesisin"
2005: "Yaşın Tutmaz"
2005: "Benim İçin N'apardın"	
2005: "Kalbim Seninle"
2007: "Tövbeliyim"
2007: "Ağlamak Sırayla"
2008: "İnkâr Etme"
2008: "Vah Vah"
2008: "Resimler & Hayaller"
2009: "Bize Aşk Lazım"
2010: "Daha Erken"
2010:"Teslim Al"
2011: "Sitemkâr"
2011: "Aşk Yorgunu"
2011: "Ezdirmem"
2013: "Budala"
2013: "İki Yeni Yabancı (Remix)"
2013: "Ne Farkeder"
2014: "Benden Sorulur"
2014: "Mis"
2016: "Eski Defter (Remix)"
2016: "Değişir Dünya"
2016: "Korkak"
2018: "Yanlış Numara"
2020: "Firardayım"
2020: "Sana Sorsunlar"
2020: "İki Kişi"
2021: "Bağrında"
2021: "Aslan Kızım"
2021: "Bu Maymunlar"

Filmography

Television series

References

External links 
 
 

1979 births
Turkish pop singers
Turkish songwriters
Turkish composers
Turkish music arrangers
Turkish male television actors
TED Ankara College Foundation Schools alumni
Living people
Universal Music Group artists
21st-century Turkish singers
21st-century Turkish male singers